Baharwali is the largest village in the taluka of Khed, India.

At the centre of the Jagbudi River, which begins at Baharwali and ends at Khopi near Khed, is an island called Diva, which is believed to be the first settlement of Baharwali in the 15th century. Its population began moving to India's mainland due to an increasing population.

Baharwali is divided into several localities: Baharwali  Mohhla No. 1, Baharwali MOHLLA  No. 2, Baharwali MOHLLA No. 3, Baharwali Buddha Wadi, and Baharwali Kunbhi Wadi (Bhaganewadi, Tep Wadi, Dewool wadi, Lad Wadi, Shigwan Wadi, madhali wadi, and Bahirwali Bhoi Wadi).

The gram panchayat (village council) or village panchayat is responsible for the developments in Baharwali. Headed by a sarpanch, its gram panchayat is divided into three parts: Bahirwali No. 1, 2, and  3.

History 

In the 15th century, Baharwali was likely inhabited during the rule of Sultan Yusuf Adil Shah in Konkan. Baharwali's first settlement, called Diva, was on an island located at the centre of the Jugburi River. As the population grew, people started moving to the mainland opposite the island.

Government 

The gram panchayat is responsible for administrative and developmental work. It is headed by the sarpanch of the village. The gram panchayat is now divided into two parts for better management.

Festivals 

Dr. Babasaheb Ambedkar Jayanti, Buddha Jayanti, Vijaya Rashmi, Sai Baba Utsav is on 19 May annually (Shigavan Wadi, Bahirawali). Hanuman Jayanti, Mahashiv Ratri (Someshwar Temple – Bhaganewadi, Bahirawali), Ganesh Utsav, and Shimoga (Holi) are also celebrated. There are temples of the grāmadevatā, Kuldevata Shri Khem - Manai. Ibrahim Shaikh, a Sufi saint, is celebrated every February.

Transport 
A bus service is regularly run between Khed and Panhale Kazi, along with rickshaw and car service, and a train service is run from Mumbai to Khed, and Mumbai to Anjani.

See also 
 Karji
 Western Ghats

References 

 Konkan Times

Villages in Ratnagiri district